Osamu Hagiwara (born August 7, 1960) is a Japanese racing driver.

Racing record

Complete Japanese Touring Car Championship results

References 

1960 births
Living people
Japanese racing drivers
Japanese Formula 3 Championship drivers